The Magamba is a river of southwestern Tanzania. It flows through the Rukwa Valley.

References

Rivers of Tanzania